The climate of Russia is formed under the influence of several determining factors. The enormous size of the country and the remoteness of many areas from the sea result in the dominance of the continental climate, which is prevalent in European and Asian Russia except for the tundra and the extreme southwest. Mountains in the south obstructing the flow of warm air masses from the Indian Ocean and the plain of the west and north makes the country open to Arctic and Atlantic influences.

Dynamics 

Due to the moderating influence of the Atlantic or Pacific, most areas of the country in European Russia, in the south of West Siberia and in the south of the Russian Far East, including the cities of Moscow and Saint Petersburg, experience a humid continental climate. (Köppen's Dfb, Dfa, Dwb, Dwa, Dsb, Dsa types). Most of Northern European Russia and Siberia between the Scandinavian Peninsula and the Pacific Ocean has a subarctic climate, with extremely severe winters (Dfd, Dwd, Dsd) in the inner regions of Northeast Siberia (mostly the Sakha Republic, where the Northern Pole of Cold is located with the record low temperature of ), and more moderate (Dwc, Dfc, Dsc) elsewhere.

The strip of land along the shore of the Arctic Ocean, as well as the Arctic islands, have a polar climate (ice cap climate (EF) on some of the islands and tundra climate (ET) elsewhere). A small portion of the Black Sea coast, most notably in Sochi, possesses a humid subtropical climate (Köppen's Cfa) with unusually wet winters. Winter is dry compared to summer in many regions of East Siberia and the Far East (Dwa, Dwb, Dwc, Dwd types), while other parts of the country experience more even precipitation across seasons. Winter precipitation in most parts of the country usually falls as snow. The region along the Lower Volga and Caspian Sea coast, as well as some areas of southernmost Siberia, possess a semi-arid climate (BSk).
The city of Kaliningrad has an Oceanic climate (Cfb) due to its relatively mild (avg. above -3C) winters and cool summers.

About 65% of the Russian territory is underlain by permafrost.

Temperature records

Extreme highs

Extreme lows

Averages and records by city

See also 
 Climate change in Russia

References 

.

 
Russia